The Comptroller of Illinois is a constitutional officer in the executive branch of government of the U.S. state of Illinois. Ten individuals have held the office of Comptroller since the enactment of the Illinois Constitution of 1970, replacing the prior office of Auditor of Public Accounts that was first created in 1799. The incumbent is Susana Mendoza, a Democrat.

Eligibility and term of office
The Comptroller is elected for a renewable four-year term during the quadrennial mid-term election. The Illinois Constitution provides that the Comptroller must, at the time of his or her election, be a United States citizen, at least 25 years old, and a resident of the state for at least 3 years preceding the election.

Powers and duties
Article V, Section 17 of the Constitution of Illinois says the Comptroller: "shall maintain the State's central fiscal accounts, and order payments into and out of the funds held by the Treasurer." In accordance with this mandate, the Comptroller is designated by law as the state's chief fiscal control officer and is responsible for the legal, efficient, and effective operations of state government. As such, the Comptroller keeps and adjusts the statewide accounting system, signs paychecks or grants approval to electronic payments made by the state to its employees and creditors, monitors cash flow, prepares the state's annual comprehensive financial report, and provides monthly debt transparency reports to the General Assembly. The Comptroller is also charged by statute with certain additional duties. In particular, the Comptroller supervises local government finances in Illinois, including reviewing local government financial data, investigating instances of waste and fraud in local governments, and publishing an annual report summarizing the revenues, expenditures, fund balance, and debt of units of local government throughout the state. Moreover, the Comptroller regulates cemeteries under the Cemetery Care Act, and is charged with the fiduciary protection of cemetery care funds used for the care and maintenance of Illinois gravesites.

Aside from his or her regular responsibilities, the Comptroller is fourth (behind the Lieutenant Governor, Attorney General, and Secretary of State, respectively) in the line of succession to the office of Governor of Illinois.

Recent history
The late Judy Baar Topinka was a moderate Republican first elected in 2010 and subsequently re-elected in 2014 to a second four-year term as Comptroller. However, Topinka died unexpectedly in December 2014. On December 19, Governor Pat Quinn appointed Jerry Stermer to succeed Topinka, to serve until January 12, 2015, when he was replaced by Leslie Munger, who was appointed by Quinn's successor as governor, Bruce Rauner. Munger was then defeated by Susana Mendoza in the 2016 special election to fill the remainder of the term through 2018.

Merger proposals
Some legislators have perceived a redundancy overlap between the offices of Comptroller and Treasurer, and have therefore proposed constitutional amendments to merge the two offices and earn administrative savings.  For example, HJRCA 12, considered by the Illinois General Assembly in the 2008-2009 session, would merge the office of Comptroller into the office of Treasurer.

In 2011, Comptroller Topinka and the Treasurer, Dan Rutherford, introduced legislation to allow voters to decide whether the offices should be merged.  The legislation was opposed by Michael Madigan, Speaker of the Illinois House of Representatives, and did not become law.

List of office holders
The following is an historic list of office holders for the Comptroller of Illinois and its preceding office, the Auditor of Public Accounts.

Auditors of Public Accounts, Northwest Territory
Rice Bullock (1799–1800)

Auditors of Public Accounts, Indiana Territory
vacant (1801–1809)

Auditors of Public Accounts, Illinois Territory
vacant (1809–1812)

Auditors of Public Accounts, State of Illinois

Comptrollers, State of Illinois

References

 
1970 establishments in Illinois
Illinois